Saw Omma was a Burmese royal title. It may mean:

 Saw Omma of Pinya:  Chief queen consort of Pinya and Ava (1350–67)
 Saw Omma of Sagaing:  Queen consort of Ava (1367–1400)

Burmese royal titles